The murder of Pam Basu, resulting from a carjacking, occurred on September 8, 1992, in Savage, Maryland.  Her death prompted the United States Congress and several states to enact tougher carjacking laws.

Carjacking and murder 
Pam Basu, age 34, was forced from her car, a 1990 BMW, at a stop sign near her home in suburban Savage, in Howard County, Maryland.  At the time, Basu was driving her 2-year-old daughter, Sarina, to her first day of preschool.  During the assault, Basu attempted to remove her daughter from the car.  However, her arm became entangled in the car's seat belt and the thieves sped away, dragging Basu along the roads for approximately two miles.  Basu died as a result of her injuries, leaving her body entangled at the fenced entrance to Wincopia Farms. 

The perpetrators also threw the child, who was fastened in a child safety seat, out of the car by the roadside; she was unharmed.

Basu's husband, Biswanath Basu, had videotaped his wife and his daughter before they left for school that morning. The prosecutors in the criminal case stated that the two perpetrators could be seen in the background of this video as they roamed the neighborhood looking for a car to steal after another stolen car they were driving had run out of gas.

Until this case, the term "carjacking" did not exist in Maryland.

Victims 

Pam Basu (February 17, 1958  September 8, 1992) was an award-winning research chemist with the W. R. Grace and Company in Columbia, Maryland.  At the time of her death, she was 34 years old.

Sarina Basu, the daughter of Pam and Biswanath Bas Basu, was 22-months-old at the time of the carjacking.  Although the perpetrators threw Sarina out of the car into the roadway, she was unharmed.

Perpetrators 
Rodney Eugene Solomon (December 22, 1965 – August 4, 2018) was 26 years old at the time of the crime. Solomon was driving the stolen vehicle while Basu was being dragged along the road to her death.  

He was convicted of murder and several other charges. The prosecution sought a death sentence, but the jury instead recommended life without parole. Solomon died at UPMC Western Maryland on August 4, 2018, at the age of 52. 

Bernard Eric Miller (born November 7, 1975) was 16 years old at the time of the crime. Although Miller was only a passenger of the carjacked vehicle, he actively participated in the crime, helping to throw Basu from the car and later extricating her battered body from it. At trial, a witness testified that he saw Miller turn around and strike several times at something in the back seat of the car before he got out of the car and tossed Sarina, still in her child car seat, into the street. Sarina was rescued unharmed by a motorist.  

Miller was convicted of murder and several other charges; he was sentenced to life in prison, but with the possibility of parole. As of August 2021, he remains in prison, incarcerated at Maryland Correctional Institution - Hagerstown.

Impact 
Basu's death shocked people nationwide and prompted the United States Congress to make carjacking a federal felony.

In 1992, Congress, in the aftermath of a spate of violent carjackings (including the Basu case), passed the Federal Anti-Car Theft Act of 1992 (FACTA), the first federal carjacking law, making it a federal crime (punishable by 15 years to life imprisonment) to use a firearm to steal "through force or violence or intimidation" a motor vehicle that had been shipped through interstate commerce. The 1992 Act, codified at 18 U.S.C. § 2119, took effect on October 25, 1992.

In addition, several states, including Maryland, have passed tougher carjacking laws because of the Basu attack, which drew national attention when it occurred.

Media 
Fatal Destiny: The Carjacking Murder of Dr. Pam Basu, by James H. Lilley, was published on March 4, 2012.  Lilley is a retired Howard County police sergeant, who had investigated the Basu case some twenty years prior to writing his book.

Fatal Destiny was named Book of the Year in 2013 by Police-Writers.com.

See also 
 Crime in Maryland
 List of kidnappings
 Wincopia Farms

References

External links
Mother Killed in Apparent Carjacking
Howard Carjack Victim Was Caught in Seat Belt

1992 in Maryland
1992 murders in the United States
Deaths by person in Maryland
Female murder victims
Murders by motor vehicle
September 1992 events in the United States